The John Coburn House was the home of John P. Coburn (1811–1873), an African-American abolitionist who aided people on the Underground Railroad. The home is currently a private residence. It is on the Black Heritage Trail and its history is included in walking tours by the Boston African American National Historic Site.

Between 1843 and 1844, Coburn commissioned architect Asher Benjamin to design a house for him at the corner of Phillips and Irving Streets. Coburn lived there with his wife, Emmeline, and their adopted son Wendell.

Black Heritage Trail 
The house is a Boston African-American historical site located on the Black Heritage Trail in Beacon Hill.

The National Park Services wrote:
The historic buildings along today's Black Heritage Trail®  were the homes, businesses, schools and churches of a thriving black community that organized, from the nation's earliest years, to sustain those who faced local discrimination and national slavery, struggling toward the equality and freedom promised in America's documents of national liberty.

References

External links
 Boston African American National Historic Site (NPS)

African-American history in Boston
History of Boston
Houses in Boston
Beacon Hill, Boston
African-American abolitionists